Love Is is the third album by Eric Burdon and the Animals. It was released in 1968 as a double album.

Background
Love Is was issued in both the United Kingdom and United States. It was the last album released before the Animals' second dissolution in 1968. An edited version of the track "Ring of Fire" was released as a single and peaked at No. 35 in the UK singles chart, breaking the top 40 in Germany, Holland, and Australia as well.

Aside from the self-penned "I'm Dying (or am I?)", the album consists entirely of cover songs with extended arrangements by the Animals and sometimes even additional lyrics and musical sections. The entire Side D is occupied by a medley of songs originally by Dantalian's Chariot, a former group of band members Zoot Money and Andy Summers. Dantalian's Chariot archivists have been unable to locate a recording of "Gemini", and it is possible that Eric Burdon and the Animals were the first to actually record the song.

This album captured the only studio work of future Police guitarist Andy Summers with the group. The recording of Traffic's "Colored Rain" includes a guitar solo by Summers which runs a full 4 minutes and 15 seconds. To ensure he ended at the right place, Zoot Money kept count throughout the solo and gave him the cue out at bar 189.

Track listing (MGM, USA)

Side one
 "River Deep, Mountain High" (Phil Spector, Jeff Barry, Ellie Greenwich)  – 7:23
 "I'm an Animal" (Sylvester Stewart)  – 5:34
 "I'm Dying (Or Am I?)" (Eric Burdon)  – 4:28

Side two
 "Ring of Fire" (June Carter, Merle Kilgore)  – 4:58
 "Colored Rain" (Steve Winwood, Jim Capaldi, Chris Wood)  – 9:38

Side three
 "To Love Somebody" (Barry Gibb, Robin Gibb)  – 6:55
 "As the Years Go Passing By" (Deadric Malone)  – 10:13

Side four
 "Gemini" (Steve Hammond) / "Madman Running Through the Fields" [listed as "The Madman"] (Zoot Money, Andy Summers)  – 17:23

Personnel
Eric Burdon & The Animals
Eric Burdon — lead vocals, spoken word
Zoot Money — bass, backing and co-lead (3, 8a) vocals, organ, piano, spoken word (8a)
Andy Summers — guitar, backing vocals
John Weider — guitar, violin, backing vocals
Barry Jenkins — drums, percussion, backing vocals
with:
Robert Wyatt - backing vocals (1)
 brass?  arranger?  female vocalist on "To Love Somebody" ??

Album versions
LP
1968, MGM SE 4591-2, U.S.A.
1968, MGM U.K.

References

1968 albums
The Animals albums
MGM Records albums